Joint Services Command and Staff College (JSCSC) is a British military academic establishment providing training and education to experienced officers of the Royal Navy, Army, Royal Air Force, Ministry of Defence Civil Service, and serving officers of other states.

History

JSCSC combined the single service provision of the British Armed Forces: Royal Naval College, Greenwich, Staff College, Camberley, RAF Staff College, Bracknell, and the Joint Service Defence College, Greenwich.  Initially formed at Bracknell in 1997, the college moved to a purpose-built facility in the grounds of the Defence Academy of the United Kingdom at Watchfield in Oxfordshire in 2000.

Command, control and organisation
JSCSC is a component of the Defence Academy and the commandant is a full member of the DA Management Board, reporting to the director of the Defence Academy.  The commandant is a two-star appointment (rear admiral, major general or air vice marshal) and can be filled by candidates from each of the three services.  Within JSCSC itself, each service is represented by a one-star assistant commandant, each with responsibility for both single service issues and delivery of training.  The dean of academic studies leads King's College London's Defence Studies Department, which provides theoretical and conceptual academic education in partnership with the military directing staff.

Courses 
As of 2016, the JSCSC provides the following courses, amongst others:
 Higher Command and Staff Course: aimed at OF-6 rank (Commodores, Brigadiers & Air Commodores) or OF-5 (Captains RN, Colonels & Group Captains)
 Advanced Command and Staff Course: aimed at OF-4 rank (Commanders, Lieutenant Colonels & Wing Commanders) 
 Intermediate Command and Staff Course: aimed at OF-3 rank (Lieutenant Commanders, Majors & Squadron Leaders)

Royal Naval Division 
 Intermediate Command and Staff Course (Maritime): Aimed at Lieutenant Commanders, Lieutenants and civil servants
 Elements:
 Command, Leadership, Management, Ethos and Ethics
 Staff and Communication Skills, including Defence Writing
 Strategic Studies: The International Environment and UK Defence Management
 Maritime Studies: Strategy, Environment, Capabilities, and the Royal Navy
 Joint Studies: Capabilities, Environment, and Joint and Combined Operations
 Intermediate Command and Staff Course (Maritime Reserve)
 Advanced Amphibious Warfare Course

Army Division 
 Intermediate Command and Staff Course (Land): Aimed at Army and Royal Marine Majors, and civil servants
 Elements:
 Staff and Communication Skills
 Command Leadership and Management
 Global Effects on Defence
 Higher Management of Defence and the Army
 Equipment and Capability
 Land Warfare – including Formation Level Planning and Military Assistance to stabilisation and Development
 Intermediate Command and Staff Course (Land Reserve)

RAF Division 
 Intermediate Command and Staff Course (Air): Aimed at Squadron Leaders and civil servants
 Elements
 Introduction 
 Air and space power 
 Strategic context 
 Warfighting and planning 
 Command, Leadership and Management

Badge
The college badge features a cormorant (Phalacrocorax carbo), with crossed swords and an anchor, symbolising all three armed services; Britain's largest seabird flies, swims on the sea surface and catches its fish underwater, yet builds its nest on dry land (either on cliffs or in riverside trees). In a simpler form, the cormorant was also used as the symbol of the Joint Service Defence College. The alumni association of the college, open to graduates of the Higher Command and Staff Course, the Advanced Command and Staff Course, and staff of the college, is named the Cormorant Club.

Commandants
The following have commanded the college:
1 September 1997 Major General T J Granville-Chapman
4 January 2000 Air Vice-Marshal B K Burridge
28 January 2002 Rear Admiral R J Lippiett
3 March 2003 Major General J McColl
1 March 2004 Major General N R Parker
July 2005 Air Vice-Marshal N D A Maddox
4 September 2007 Rear Admiral N Morisetti
8 October 2009 Major General G Binns
2 September 2010 Air Vice-Marshal R Lock
31 August 2012 Rear Admiral J Morse
August 2014 Major-General J R Free
February 2017 Air Vice-Marshal Chris Luck
May 2019 Major General Andrew Roe

References

External links
 JSCSC
 JSCSC Courses

 
Staff colleges
Military education and training in the United Kingdom